The 2003 World Series of Poker (WSOP) was held at Binion's Horseshoe.

Preliminary events

Main Event
There were 839 entrants to the main event. Each paid $10,000 to enter what was the largest poker tournament ever played in a brick and mortar casino at the time.  Many entrants, including the overall winner Chris Moneymaker, won their seat in online poker tournaments. The 2003 Main Event was the first tournament to pay out at least $2,500,000 to the winner. Dan Harrington made the final table and looked to win his second Main Event championship, but fell short in third place.

Final table

*Career statistics prior to the beginning of the 2003 Main Event.

Final table results

Other Notable Finishes

World Series of Poker
World Series of Poker